Hugo Ezequiel Gutiérrez (born 16 December 1991) is an Argentine former footballer.

See also
Football in Argentina
List of football clubs in Argentina

References

External links
 Profile at BDFA

1991 births
Living people
Argentine footballers
Argentine expatriate footballers
Deportes Concepción (Chile) footballers
Expatriate footballers in Chile
Association footballers not categorized by position
Footballers from Rosario, Santa Fe